= Shipping modes =

Shipping modes may refer to:

- Terms of shipment
- Business-to-business (B to B)
- Shipping (B to C)
- Store to store (A to A)
